Lost Holiday is a 2019 American mystery comedy film written, produced and directed by Michael Matthews and Thomas Matthews and starring Kate Lyn Sheil.

Cast
Kate Lyn Sheil
Thomas Matthews
Keith Poulson
William Jackson Harper
Ismenia Mendes
Emily Mortimer (voice)
Tone Tank
Joshua Leonard
Isiah Whitlock Jr.

Production
The film was shot in 16mm.

Release
The film premiered at the 2019 Slamdance Film Festival.

In September 2019, Comedy Dynamics acquired distribution rights to the film.

Reception
The film has  rating on Rotten Tomatoes.  Bradley Gibson of Film Threat awarded the film a 6 out of 10.

References

External links
 
 

2019 films
2010s comedy mystery films
American comedy mystery films
2019 comedy films
2010s English-language films
2010s American films